Ole Ernst Pedersen (16 May 1940 – 1 September 2013) was a Danish actor, active on stage, TV and film. He appeared in 95 films and television shows from 1967 to 2013. He starred in the 1983 film Der er et yndigt land, which won an Honourable Mention at the 33rd Berlin International Film Festival.

Ernst died on 1 September 2013, aged 73, from undisclosed causes.

Selected filmography
 The Olsen Gang on the Track (1975)
 Per (1975)
 The Olsen Gang Sees Red (1976)
 Terror (1977)
 Fængslende feriedage (1978)
 The Olsen Gang Long Gone (1981)
 Der er et yndigt land (1983)
 Epidemic (1987)
 Katinka (1988)
 Black Harvest (1993)
 Okay (2002)
 Stealing Rembrandt (2003)
 Ronal the Barbarian (2011)

References

External links

1940 births
2013 deaths
Danish male film actors
Male actors from Copenhagen
Best Actor Bodil Award winners
20th-century Danish male actors